Tewae-Siassi District (also spelled Tewae-Siasi District) is a district of the Morobe Province of Papua New Guinea.  Its Head Quarter is Sialum.  The population of the district was 54,340 at the 2011 census.

References

Districts of Papua New Guinea
Morobe Province